The term Mangitli can refer to:
A member of the Uzbek Manġit dynasty.
Ulaş Mangıtlı, a Turkish cartoonist and illustrator